Sky & Telescope (S&T) is a monthly American magazine covering all aspects of amateur astronomy, including the following:
current events in astronomy and space exploration;
events in the amateur astronomy community;
reviews of astronomical equipment, books, and computer software;
amateur telescope making; and
astrophotography.

The articles are intended for the informed lay reader and include detailed discussions of current discoveries, frequently by participating scientists. The magazine is illustrated in full color, with both amateur and professional photography of celestial sights, as well as tables and charts of upcoming celestial events.

History
Sky & Telescope was founded by Charles A Federer and his wife Helen Spence Federer and began publication at Harvard College Observatory in November 1941, as a result of the merger of the separate magazines, The Sky and The Telescope. In 2005, Sky Publishing Corporation was acquired by New Track Media, a portfolio company of the private equity firm Boston Ventures. In 2014, New Track was sold to F+W Media. Following the mid 2019 bankruptcy of F+W media, the magazine was sold to the American Astronomical Society.

The magazine played an important role in the dissemination of knowledge about telescope making, through the column "Gleanings for ATMs" that ran from 1933 to 1990.

Its main competitor is Astronomy.

See also
Amateur astronomy
Amateur telescope making

References

External links

1941 establishments in the United States
Amateur astronomy
Monthly magazines published in the United States
Science and technology magazines published in the United States
Astronomy in the United States
Astronomy magazines
Magazines established in 1941
Magazines published in Boston